Geoffrey W. Lewis (born in Brookline, Massachusetts, died August 1, 1992, Rockland, Maine) was a career diplomat who served as the United States Ambassador to Mauritania and the Central African Republic.

A Harvard graduate, Lewis went on to study at Trinity College in England before becoming headmaster of the Browne and Nichols School, Cambridge, Massachusetts, in 1937.  Lewis was a United States Army colonel in London during World War II.

He started at the State Department in 1946 and worked there until his retirement in 1970 while he was Ambassador to Mauritania.

At the time of his death, which was complications from heart and kidney disease, he was 82 years old and lived in Cushing, Maine.

References

Year of birth missing
1992 deaths
People from Brookline, Massachusetts
People from Cushing, Maine
Harvard University alumni
Alumni of Trinity College, Cambridge
American school administrators
Ambassadors of the United States to Mauritania
United States Army colonels
United States Army personnel of World War II
20th-century American diplomats
Military personnel from Massachusetts